AS Poya is a New Caledonian football team playing at the top level. It is based in Poya.

References
 

Football clubs in New Caledonia